The bishopric of Lavaur (Tarn, France) (in Latin: dioecesis Vaurensis) was founded by Pope John XXII in his plan to reorganize the sprawling diocese of Toulouse.  The town is situated some fifteen miles to the east of Toulouse.  Lavaur had the reputation of being one of the strongest centers of Catharism, being referred to as sedes Satanae, atque erroris haeretici primatica ('seat of Satan and prime source of heretical error'  The diocese consisted of some 80–90 parishes.  It hosted one abbey, that of Sorèz, a convent of the Clarisses, a convent of the Daughters of the Cross, a convent of Dominicans, one of Franciscans, one of Capuchins,  two of reformed Dominicans, and two houses of the Doctrinaires.  The diocese produced some 35,000 livres for the bishop.

The diocese was abolished by the Concordat of 1801.

History

The diocese had its primitive origins in a donation made in 1098 by three sons of Guillaume Seigneur of the chateau of Lavaur, one of whom was Isarn, the Bishop of Toulouse.  They gave to the monks of Saint-Pons the church of Saint-Élan (Alain) in the territory of Toulouse, not far from their chateau, on the left bank of the River Agoût;  the church was in need of rebuilding; the mission of the monks was to rebuild the church, around which grew a small town (villa).  During the Albigensian Crusade the town, which was politically in the County of Toulouse and subject to the heretic Count Raymond of Toulouse, was besieged. The town was fortified in the 13th century.  The monastery church became the Cathedral of Saint-Alain in the fourteenth century, when the diocese was created.

Pope John XXII created the diocese of Lavaur in a bull dated 22 February 1317.

The Cathedral Chapter had twelve Canons, among whom were the dignities of Provost, Archdeacon, Sacristan, and Precentor. The Bishop had a vote in Chapter meetings, though he was not a member of the Chapter.  There were also four hebdomidary chaplains and twenty-eight ordinary chaplains.

From 1622, the town of Lavaur became headquarters for the royal operations against Henri, Duke of Rohan.  The Count de Vieule was named Governor of Castres and Lavaur, and the César, Duke of Vendôme, the natural brother of Louis XIII, was placed in charge of operations.  Under Louis XIV, the King took a more active role in determining the talents of prospective bishops of Lavaur.

In 1671 the city of Lavaur had approximately 3,000 Catholics, and the diocese had approximately 65 parishes.  In 1768, there were perhaps 4,000 Catholics, and there were 88 parishes.

The French Revolution
In 1790 the Constituent Assembly passed a number of anti-Catholic laws, the culmination of which was the Civil Constitution of the Clergy, which reduced the number of dioceses in France from 135 to 83, and made these dioceses coterminous with the new civil administrative districts, the 'départements'.  The old dioceses were abolished. Clergy were to be provided with salaries, but they were required to take an oath of allegiance to the State.  Bishops were to be elected by the electors of each department, rather than appointed by the King and approved by the Pope, as had been provided for in the Concordat of Bologna of 1516 between Francis I and Leo X.  An elector need not be a Catholic, which meant that non-Catholics would be taking part in the selection of Catholic bishops.  The inevitable result was schism between the French 'Constitutional Church' and the Roman Catholic Church.

The diocese of Lavaur, which was on the schedule of dioceses to be abolished, was subsumed into the new 'diocèse de Tarn', a suffragan of the Metropole du Sud, with its seat at Albi.  The electors of Tarn duly met at Castres on 13–15 March 1791, and elected Abbé Jean-Joachim Gausserand as their Constitutional Bishop; it was presumed that Cardinal de Bernis, in refusing to take the oath, had resigned the See of Albi.  The Bishop of Lavaur had protested and fled to Spain. Gausserand was consecrated in Paris on 3 April 1791 by the Metropolitan of Rhone-et-Loire (Lyon), Antoine-Adrien Lamourette. The new bishop's reception in Albi was frosty, and in Lavaur it was icy.  After the Terror, when religion was reconstituted, Gausserand discovered that he had lost 200 priests through abdication, and that 40 were married;  several had left their priestly duties and were functioning as civil administrators. In 1797 he admitted that fewer than 100 priests continued to function in the 'diocese of Tarn'.  When the Concordat of 1801 was negotiated between First Consul Bonaparte and Pope Pius VII, Gausserand refused to submit or recant, and, when steps were being taken in 1808 to place him under Interdict, he removed himself to Toulouse. He died on 12 February 1820.

In the implementation of the Concordat of 1801, the diocese of Lavaur was not restored.

Bishops

1300 to 1500

1317-1338 : Roger d'Armagnac
1338-1348 : Robert de Foix
1348-1357 : Archambaud de Lautrec
1357-1360 : Gilles Aycelin de Montaigu
1360-1383 : Robert de Via de Villamuro
1383-1390 : Gilles Aycelin de Bellemère
1390-1394 : Guy de la Roche
1394-1397 : Bernard de Chevenon
1397-1405 : Pierre de Vissac
1405-1408 : Bertrand de Maumont
1408-1410 : Pierre Neveu
1410-1415 : Pierre Girard, Cardinal
1415-1433 : Jean Belli
1434-1459 : Jean Boucher
1460-1469 : Jean Gentian
1469-1497 : Jean Vigier
1497-1500 : Hector de Bourbon

1500 to 1800

1500-1514 : Pierre de Rosergues
1514 : Giulio de' Medici, Administrator
1514-1525 : Simon de Beausoleil
1525-1526 : Pierre de Buis
1526-1540 : Georges de Selve
1542-1557 : Pierre de Mareuil
1557-1577 : Pierre Danès
1577-1582 : Pierre Dufaur de Pibrac
[? 1582-1583 : René de Birague, Cardinal]
1583-1601 : Horace de Birague
1606-1636 : Claude Duvergier
1636-1647 : Charles François d'Abra de Raconis
1647-1668 : Jean-Vincent de Tulles
1670-1671 : Sébastien de Guémadeuc (Quémadeuc)
1671-1673 : Michel Amelot de Gournay
1675-1677 : René Le Sauvage
1677-1685 : Charles le Goux de la Berchère
1685-1687 : Esprit Fléchier
1687-1712 : Victor-Augustin de Mailly-Nesles
1713-1748 : Nicolas de Malézieu
1748-1764 : Jean-Baptiste Joseph de Fontanges
1765-1770 : Jean de Dieu-Raymond de Boisgelin de Cucé
1770-1802 : Jean-Antoine de Castellane-Saint-Maurice

See also
 Catholic Church in France
 List of Catholic dioceses in France

References

Bibliography

Reference works
 pp. 582–584. (Use with caution; obsolete)
  (in Latin) pp. 356.
 (in Latin) p. 199.
 p. 253.
 pp. 252.
 pp. 280.
 p. 301.

Studies

 

Lavaur
Religious organizations established in the 1310s
Dioceses established in the 14th century
1317 establishments in Europe
1310s establishments in France
1802 disestablishments in France